KCSG (channel 8) is a television station licensed to Cedar City, Utah, United States, airing programming from the classic television network MeTV. Owned and operated by network parent Weigel Broadcasting, the station maintains studios on West 1600 South Street in St. George, and its transmitter is located on Cedar Mountain, southeast of Cedar City. KCSG has a network of 11 broadcast translators that extend its over-the-air coverage throughout the state. It is also available on DirecTV, Dish Network, Galaxy 19, and cable systems throughout the geographically large Salt Lake City media market.

History 
KCSG began as KCCZ, with a construction permit issued on June 11, 1984 to Michael Glenn Golden. After several extensions and replacements of expired permits, and transfer of the permit to Liberty Broadcasting Company, the station first signed on the air on April 23, 1990, operating as an independent station; it was licensed by the Federal Communications Commission on June 21, 1990. However, financial difficulties doomed KCCZ and it shut down in November 1992. Liberty Broadcasting filed for Chapter 11 bankruptcy on December 17, 1992, but the filing had to be converted to Chapter 7 bankruptcy on June 22, 1993. On October 20, Seagull Communications Company, whose principals owned KSGI radio (1450 AM, now KZNU, and 99.9 FM, now KONY) in St. George, filed an application to acquire the station out of bankruptcy and on November 12, changed its call letters to KSGI-TV to match the radio stations. The acquisition was approved by the FCC and consummated on February 1, 1994. Seagull Communications returned the station to air the same day, again as an independent station.

Almost immediately, the new owners applied to the FCC to build booster stations serving St. George, Utah and Beaver Dam, Arizona/Mesquite, Nevada, communities cut off from the signal due to the mountainous terrain of those areas. The FCC granted the construction permit for the St. George booster, KSGI1 (later KCSG1), on February 28, 1995, but did not grant a permit for the Beaver Dam booster, KSGI2 (later KCSG2), until January 1998. That station was never built, but the construction permit remained in the FCC database until 2009.

In 1997, Seagull Communications sold KSGI-TV to Bonneville Holding Company, a broadcasting company wholly owned by the Church of Jesus Christ of Latter-day Saints. The sale was approved by the FCC on December 10, 1997 and was consummated on April 27, 1998. On February 16, 1998, the station changed its call letters to KXIV, in anticipation of its DTV channel assignment on UHF channel 14, but the FCC adopted the virtual channel standard, whereby digital stations would continue to identify by their analog channel assignment, and on May 15, 1998, the station again changed call letters, this time to KCSG. On August 31, 1998, the station became a charter affiliate of the family-oriented network Pax TV (now Ion Television). In August 2002, KCSG was sold to Broadcast West, a St. George-based partnership of Daniel Matheson and local auto dealer Stephen Wade. The new owners elected to continue the Pax affiliation and to maintain an association with Bonneville-owned KSL-TV (channel 5).

Broadcast West began to make changes to KCSG that would establish its identity as a Southern Utah station. In 2003, the company founded the region's first television news department for the station. Before, the only local news program available to residents of Cedar City and St. George came from Salt Lake City area stations. In June 2005, with Pax TV preparing to adopt a more general entertainment format, KCSG switched its affiliation to America One, continuing to offer family-focused programming. The station made news in September 2005, when it began offering its news programs in Spanish, as well as in English, attempting to serve the region's growing Hispanic population. The Broadcast West partnership was dissolved on October 18, 2005, and a new company, Southwest Media, owned by Stephen Wade, became the licensee.

On August 18, 2008, KCSG replaced Salt Lake City's KJZZ-TV (also on channel 14) as Utah's MyNetworkTV affiliate. The station added programming from the Retro Television Network, which was previously carried in the market by KUSG and KCBU, in 2009. For a time, starting on September 20, 2010, KCSG was one of two MyNetworkTV affiliates serving the geographically large Utah media market, along with KUSG; the affiliation was subsequently ceded completely to the renamed KMYU (channel 12).

On September 5, 2011, KCSG switched its primary affiliation to classic television network MeTV. On July 26, 2012, KCSG added FamilyNet to Baja Broadband channel 87. FamilyNet is limited to cable and satellite viewing because of programming restrictions placed on it by the network. Otherwise, FamilyNet would have been added to digital subchannel 14.4.

On September 29, 2014, KCSG switched its affiliation from MeTV to Heroes & Icons, a new network owned by MeTV's parent company (and KCSG's future owner), Weigel Broadcasting, as its first non-owned affiliate. The network mainly carries a format of crime shows and westerns targeted to men from the MeTV acquisition library. MeTV is still available throughout the state via KTVX-DT2.

On July 19, 2017, Weigel (through TV-49, Inc., the licensee of WMLW-TV in Racine, Wisconsin) agreed to acquire the station for $1.1 million. The sale will convert KCSG in a H&I owned-and-operated station, though the possibility of Weigel's other networks being contained to it is also possible. It would also be Weigel's first purchase of any station outside of a state along Lake Michigan, as all of its properties are in Illinois, Wisconsin and Indiana. The sale closed on December 5, with the St. George-related channel contracts voided the week before in order to make it a station only carrying H&I and Decades for the moment.

Programming

News operation
KCSG was the first television station in southern Utah to produce local newscasts for the region. Until KCSG started its news department, St. George residents received local newscasts from stations in Salt Lake City; indeed, KCSG itself simulcast KSL-TV's morning newscast for a time under Bonneville ownership. The station's news operation began in 2003 with a five-minute newscast; this subsequently expanded to half-hour newscasts at 5:30 p.m. and 9:00 p.m. KCSG discontinued its newscasts on February 19, 2010; the station still broadcasts news updates and still places news stories on its website.

After a six-month hiatus, full-scale newscasts were reinstated on August 23, 2010, with the early evening newscast now airing at 6:30 p.m., in addition to the 9 p.m. newscast. KCSG previously announced a partnership with Dixie State College of Utah. In late August 2011, KCSG began rebroadcasting the first half-hour of KSL-TV's 6 p.m. newscast at 7 p.m., and its 6:30 p.m. newscast re-airs at 9 p.m. Both newscasts are titled KSL Live 5 News on KCSG.

Sports programming
On August 4, 2011, Utah State University announced that it had partnered with KCSG to show select football and men's and women's basketball games on the station.

The St. George Marathon, the City of St. George First Night and the Huntsman World Senior Games are broadcast on KCSG.

Technical information

Subchannels
The station's digital signal is multiplexed:

Analog-to-digital conversion
KCSG shut down its analog signal, over VHF channel 4, on June 12, 2009, as part of the federally mandated transition from analog to digital television. The station's digital signal broadcasts on its pre-transition UHF channel 14.

Translators
Beaver: K25PF-D
Delta–Oak City: K25PF-D
Fillmore–Meadow: K25JJ-D
Garrison: K30PI-D
Leamington: K16MT-D
Logan: K08QL-D
Logan: K22MH-D
Minersville: K17HX-D
Parowan–Enoch–Parowan: K25PD-D
St. George: K16DS-D
St. George: K27MQ-D

References

External links

CSG
Television channels and stations established in 1990
1990 establishments in Utah
Companies that have filed for Chapter 7 bankruptcy
Companies that filed for Chapter 11 bankruptcy in 1992
MeTV affiliates
Heroes & Icons affiliates
Decades (TV network) affiliates
Start TV affiliates
Story Television affiliates
OnTV4U affiliates
Weigel Broadcasting